Vladimir Lazović (born 1954 in Belgrad) is Serbian science fiction and fantasy writer.

He has been writing fiction since his twenties, in a variety of genres: his works range over alternate history, Slavic-mythology based fantasy, and cyberpunk.

Bibliography
 Hrim, the warrior (Hrim, ratnik), a novel, (under pen-name Valdemar Lejzi), X–100 SF, Dnevnik, Novi Sad, 1987.

Noted anthologies and collections:
 Kiberpank, Sirius, Zagreb
 Tamni vilajet 1, Beograd, edited by Boban Knežević, Znak Sagite, Beograd, 1987. 
 Tamni vilajet 1a, Beograd, edited by Boban Knežević, Znak Sagite, Beograd, 1987.
 Tamni vilajet 2, edited by Boban Knežević, Znak Sagite, Beograd, 1992.
 Tamni vilajet 3, edited by Boban Knežević, Znak Sagite, Beograd, 1993.
 Tamni vilajet 4, edited by Boban Knežević, Znak Sagite, Beograd, 1996.
 Nova srpska fantastika, edited by Boban Knežević & Sava Damjanov, SIC, Beograd, 1994.
 Monolit 8, edited by Boban Knežević, Znak Sagite, Beograd.
 Domaća post(žanrovska) fantastika na početku veka u Orbis, Kanjiža, edited by Ilija Bakić
 Domaća (post)žanrovska fantastika s kraja 90-ih u Orbis, Kanjiža, edited by Ilija Bakić 
 Domaće fantastičke priče u Naš trag, Velika Plana, edited by Ilija Bakić
 Tamna zvezda, Presing, Niš, edited by Dejan Ognjanović, Niš, 2005.
 Ugriz strasti (priče erotske fantastike), edited by Pavle Zelić, SFFC „Lazar Komarčić“, 2007.

Awards 
 „Lazar Komarčić“ award for best novella in 1987. („Sokolar“)
 „Sfera“ for best novella in 1987. („Sokolar“)
 „Lazar Komarčić“ award for best novella in 1994. („Preko duge“)
 „Lazar Komarčić“ award for best novella in  2003. („Beli vitez“), with Vladimir Vesović

External links  
 [www.lazarkomarcic.org/ "Društvo ljubitelja fantastike „Lazar Komarčić“]

Serbian science fiction writers
Serbian male short story writers
Serbian short story writers
Serbian novelists
1954 births
Serbian alternate history writers
Living people
Writers from Belgrade
Cyberpunk writers
Serbian fantasy writers
Horror writers
20th-century Serbian novelists
20th-century short story writers
20th-century male writers